Love and Deficit (Swedish: Kärlek och kassabrist) is a 1932 Swedish comedy film directed by Gustaf Molander and starring Sigurd Wallén, Tutta Rolf and Edvin Adolphson. It was shot at the Råsunda Studios in Stockholm. The film's art direction was by Arne Åkermark.

Main cast
 Sigurd Wallén as Andersson  
 Tutta Rolf as Margit Hauge  
 Edvin Adolphson as Bengt Berger  
 Dagmar Ebbesen as Augusta  
 Ruth Stevens as Svea Strandin  
 Thor Modéen as Manager Gyllén  
 Nils Lundell as Acel Lindell  
 Victor Lundberg as Embezzler 
 Doris Nelson as Teacher  
 John Melin as Olsson  
 Ludde Juberg as Embezzler

References

Bibliography 
 Qvist, Per Olov & von Bagh, Peter. Guide to the Cinema of Sweden and Finland. Greenwood Publishing Group, 2000.

External links 
 

1932 films
Swedish comedy films
1932 comedy films
1930s Swedish-language films
Films directed by Gustaf Molander
Films based on works by Vilhelm Moberg
Swedish black-and-white films
1930s Swedish films